New Zealand has maintained a resident ambassador in Mexico since 1983.  The Ambassador to Mexico is concurrently accredited to Costa Rica, Cuba, Dominican Republic, El Salvador, Guatemala, Nicaragua, Panama and Venezuela. The embassy is located at Jaime Balmes 8, Polanco, Mexico City.

List of heads of mission

Ambassadors to Mexico

Non-resident ambassadors, resident in the United States
 Lloyd White (1974–1978)
 Merwyn Norrish (1978–1980)
 Frank Gill (1980–1982)
 Lance Adams-Schneider (1982–1983)

Resident ambassadors
 Peter Fairfax (1983–1986)
 Rodney Denham (1986–1990)
 Bruce Middleton (1990–1993)
 Laurie Markes (1993–1997)
 Bronwen Chang (1997–2001)
 Paul Tipping (2001–2004)
 George Troup (2004–2007)
 Cecile Hillyer (2007–2011)
 Christine Bogle (2011–2013)
 Clare Kelly (2013–2017)
 Mark Sinclair (2017–2021)
 Sara Meymand (2021–)

Chargés d’affaires a.i.
 Lucy Duncan (2017)
 Andrew Townend (2020, 2021)

See also
 Mexico–New Zealand relations

References
 New Zealand Representatives Overseas: Mexico
 Embassy of New Zealand in Mexico City

Mexico, Ambassadors from New Zealand to
New Zealand